The Frenz Experiment is the tenth studio album by English post-punk band the Fall. It was released on 29 February 1988 through record label Beggars Banquet. In October 2020, an expanded remastered edition was produced, containing singles, b-sides and other tracks recorded in the same era.

Background 
Smith originally intended to call the album Gene Crime Experience, until he realised that its initials are "GCE". The phrase does still feature on the back cover of the CD.

A strong similarity between "Athlete Cured" and Spinal Tap's "Tonight I'm Gonna Rock You Tonight" has been noted. In his autobiography The Big Midweek, bassist Steve Hanley confirms that the resemblance was not accidental, admitting that the group had been jamming the Spinal Tap song in soundchecks and that Mark E. Smith had decided to make use of the results. Hanley also states that producer Simon Rogers had been so annoyed by the lift that he came close to walking off the project.

Guitarist Brix Smith claimed she co-wrote a number of the tracks but was largely omitted from the song writing credits.

Release 

The Frenz Experiment was released on 29 February 1988. It reached number 19 in the UK album chart, making it the Fall's first Top 20 album. The group promoted the release with a live appearance in HMV's Oxford Street store in London. They opened the short set with "Cab It Up!", a new song that would appear on the group's following album, I Am Kurious Oranj.

Like the group's other albums with Beggars Banquet, Frenz has a different track listing across various formats (LP, CD and cassette). A number of tracks are credited exclusively to Mark E. Smith, but the album also incorporates two cover versions (or one, depending on the format): "Victoria", originally by The Kinks, and "There's a Ghost in My House", a northern soul track first recorded by R. Dean Taylor in 1966. The Fall's version of "Victoria" was released as a single, making it to No. 35 in the British charts. The latter cover only appears on the CD version of the album, having been issued as a single in April 1987, reaching number 30. This was the group's highest singles chart position to date and remains so.

In October 2020, a remastered, expanded edition of the album was released on double vinyl and CD, including tracks from the singles "There's a Ghost in My House", "Hit the North" and "Victoria". The CD version also contains the Fall's cover of A Day in the Life by The Beatles, from the NME charity album Sgt. Pepper Knew My Father, and a BBC Janice Long session.

Reception 

The Frenz Experiment was generally well received by music critics. Pitchfork, in a 2000 review, gave the album a positive rating but described it as "a bit of a mixed bag. On no other record than the weak 1994 effort Middle Class Revolt do they sound more like they're on autopilot."

Track listing 

Original UK LP

Bonus 7": Bremen Nacht Run Out (UK/German first pressings only)

2020 expanded CD edition

2020 expanded LP edition

Record 1
as per original LP.

Record 2

Personnel 

 The Fall

 Mark E. Smith – lead vocals, electric piano on "Bremen Nacht"
 Brix Smith – lead guitar, backing vocals
 Craig Scanlon – rhythm guitar, backing vocals
 Steve Hanley – bass guitar, backing vocals
 Simon Wolstencroft – drums, backing vocals
 Marcia Schofield – keyboards, backing vocals
Additional personnel
 Simon Rogers – semi-acoustic guitar, electric saxophone, keyboards, backing vocals

 Technical

 Simon Rogers – production   
 Grant Showbiz – production 
 Dian Barton – production, engineering
 Ian Grimble – production, engineering
 Step Parikian – engineering
 Dave Luff – arrangement on "Oswald Defence Lawyer"
 Paul Cox – front cover photography
 Steve Pyke – back cover photography

References

External links 

 

1988 albums
The Fall (band) albums
Albums produced by Grant Showbiz
Beggars Banquet Records albums